365 Days is a 2020 Polish erotic thriller film directed by Barbara Białowąs and Tomasz Mandes. Based on the first novel of a trilogy by Blanka Lipińska, the plot follows a young Warsaw woman (Anna-Maria Sieklucka) in a spiritless relationship falling for a dominant Sicilian man (Michele Morrone), who imprisons and imposes on her a period of 365 days for which to fall in love with him.

The film was released theatrically in Poland on 7 February 2020 and was later made available on Netflix on 7 June 2020. It quickly gained global attention, becoming one of the most watched items in numerous territories on multiple continents, and having one of the longest periods as the most watched item in Netflix's history in the United States. Despite this popularity, the film received universally negative reviews, with criticism aimed at its perceived glorification of the Mafia and heavy use of sex sequences that included sexual violence, drawing comparisons to the Fifty Shades trilogy.

A sequel, entitled 365 Days: This Day, was released on Netflix on 27 April 2022.

Plot

After a meeting between the Torricelli Sicilian Mafia crime family and black market dealers, Massimo Torricelli watches a beautiful woman on a beach and talks with his father, the mafia boss. Suddenly, the dealers shoot Massimo and his father; Massimo survives while his father dies from his injuries.

Five years later, Massimo is the leader of the Torricelli crime family. In Warsaw, Laura Biel is unhappy in her relationship with her boyfriend, Martin. Laura celebrates her 29th birthday in Italy with Martin and her friend Olga, but after Martin visits Etna without her, she goes for a walk and runs into Massimo, who kidnaps her.

At his villa, Massimo reveals to Laura that she was the woman at the beach five years ago and that when he was injured, all he could think about was her. After searching for years and finally spotting her, he kidnapped her, intending to keep her as a prisoner for 365 days in the hopes that she will fall in love with him. He also promises her that he will not touch her intimately without her consent while he is physically and sexually aggressive towards her.

As they spend time together, Laura teases him and then refuses to have sex with him. At a hotel in Rome, she begins to tease him again and he cuffs her to the bed. Massimo then makes Laura watch him receive oral sex from another woman. Afterward, he claims he is going to rape her but changes his mind and orders her to get dressed for a club.

At the club, Laura flaunts herself to Massimo and his friends, angering him. When she begins to flirt with a man from the rival mafia family, the man gropes her. Massimo draws his weapons and Laura is taken out of the club. The following morning, she awakens on a yacht to Massimo and his fellow mafioso, Mario, arguing. Massimo confesses that he shot the man's hand who had groped Laura, inciting a war between the two families. Laura attempts to apologize, but Massimo blames her for the incident. They argue and Laura falls into the water and starts to panic. Massimo jumps in to save her. When she regains consciousness, he admits he was scared she might not make it and does not want to lose her. Laura begins to fellate Massimo and the two engage in sex repeatedly.
  
Later that evening, Massimo and Laura attend a masquerade ball, where a woman named Anna threatens Laura. Massimo reveals that he dated Anna, but told her that he would leave if he found Laura, and did so when he recognized Laura at the airport.

After the ball, Massimo and Laura have sex again. He tells her he is sending her to visit her loved ones in Warsaw and promises to join her after finishing up business. He then tells her he loves her.

On the car ride to the airport, Domenico, another one of Massimo's mafiosos, tried to reassure a nervous Laura that Anna won't hurt her but gets a phone call, tells Laura to wait in Warsaw, and rushes away.

In Warsaw, Laura waits for Massimo for days with no contact. She reconnects with her best friend Olga and they go clubbing. She runs into Martin, who says he has been looking for her to apologize. He attempts to convince her to reconcile and follows her back to her apartment, where Massimo is unexpectedly waiting. Martin leaves and Laura and Massimo have sex. When Laura opens his shirt, she discovers his wounds from the ongoing conflict. She confesses to him that she loves him. The following morning, Massimo proposes and she accepts. However, she asks him to keep his "occupation" a secret from her parents.

Back in Italy, Mario informs Massimo of rising tensions. Laura mentions feeling unwell but brushes off seeing a doctor. They discuss their upcoming wedding that her family is not allowed to attend, as she does not want them to discover what Massimo does. However, Massimo allows Olga to come as Laura's bridesmaid. When Olga visits, Laura reveals she is pregnant. Olga urges her to tell Massimo about the pregnancy. Laura calls him and asks if they can talk after dinner. Meanwhile, Mario receives a phone call from a Torricelli informant that the rival mafia family is about to kill Laura. Laura's car enters a tunnel but does not come out the other side. Mario rushes to find Massimo just as Laura's call drops. Realizing the implications, Massimo breaks down. A police car blocks the entrance of the tunnel.

Cast

 Anna-Maria Sieklucka as Laura Biel
 Michele Morrone as Escudero "Massimo" 
 Bronisław Wrocławski as Mario
 Otar Saralidze as Domenico
 Magdalena Lamparska as Olga
 Natasza Urbańska as Anna
 Grażyna Szapołowska as Klara Biel, Laura's mother
 Tomasz Stockinger as Tomasz Biel, Laura's father
 Gianni Parisi as Massimo's father
 Mateusz Łasowski as Martin
 Blanka Lipińska as a bride

Production
The film scenes were primarily shot in Poland (Warsaw, Krakow and Niepołomice) and in Italy (Sanremo).

Soundtrack
The film's theme song, "Feel It", along with the songs "Watch Me Burn", "Dark Room" and "Hard for Me", are sung by Morrone. The songs "I See Red", "Give 'Em Hell" and "Wicked Ways" were sung by Everybody Loves an Outlaw, a.k.a. Bonnie and Taylor Sims. "I See Red" made #1 on Spotify's Viral 50 chart in the US, with "Hard for Me" also in the top 5. Morrone and Everybody Loves an Outlaw entered the top 10 of Rolling Stone's Breakthrough 25 Chart.

Release
365 Days was released in Poland on 7 February 2020, grossing $9 million. In the United Kingdom, the film received a limited theatrical release on 14 February 2020, and grossed $494,181, before premiering on Netflix in June 2020.

Reception
The film made the top three most viewed items on Netflix in numerous countries, including Germany, Brazil, Saudi Arabia, Lebanon, Lithuania, Switzerland, Netherlands, Belgium, Turkey, Sweden, Austria, Czech Republic, Slovakia, Greece, Romania, South Africa, Portugal, Pakistan, Bangladesh, India, UAE, UK, Mauritius, Canada, Israel, New Zealand, Malaysia, and USA. It was the first movie to have two multiday periods as Netflix's #1 movie in the US: it was #1 for 4 days, then replaced in that position by Da 5 Bloods, but then, 3 days later, returned to #1. The film has thus had 10 days as #1, the second highest in the chart's history.

365 Days drew parallels with the 2015 erotic drama Fifty Shades of Grey. It was criticised for romanticising kidnapping and rape.

Jessica Kiang of Variety described the film as "a thoroughly terrible, politically objectionable, occasionally hilarious Polish humpathon". The Guardian, after citing other media – "Variety called it 'dumber-than-hair'. Cosmopolitan labelled it 'the worst thing I've ever seen'" – highlights the film's "dismal dialogue", poor character development and "unsexy" sex scenes.

Filmmaker Gaspar Noe was critical to the film, said: “There is also that very stupid Polish movie that was number one. It’s because people need to masturbate. They have a penis or… the other way around.” he explains. “They just need to play with their toys.”

On June 17, 2020, Collectif Soeurcières, a French feminist collective, started an online petition through Change.org, addressing Netflix France, to pull the film from streaming availability. As of August 16, it gained 40,000 signatures. On July 2, 2020, singer Duffy wrote an open letter, addressing Netflix CEO Reed Hastings, criticizing the film for glamorizing sexual violence. "This should not be anyone's idea of entertainment, nor should it be described as such, or be commercialized in this manner", she said. After this, another Change.org petition, initiated by social media influencer Mikayla Zazon, gained over 70,000 signatures. On July 8, 2020, PTC president Timothy F. Winter requested Netflix to remove the film from the platform.

Accolades
In March 2021, the film was nominated for six Golden Raspberry Awards, including Worst Picture.

Sequels

Plans for a sequel, titled This Day, were delayed due to the COVID-19 pandemic. In May 2021, it was reported that Netflix had started filming two sequels concurrently, with several cast members returning. Morrone, Sieklucka and Lamparska are all confirmed as returning. The titles of the sequels were referred to as 365 Days Part 2 and 365 Days Part 3. The second movie, retitled to 365 Days: This Day, premiered on Netflix on April 27, 2022. The third movie, retitled to The Next 365 Days, premiered on August 19, 2022.

See also
 List of films considered the worst

References

External links
 

2020 films
2020 romantic drama films
2020s erotic drama films
2020s English-language films
Erotic romance films
Films about the Sicilian Mafia
Films based on Polish novels
Films directed by Barbara Białowąs
Films directed by Tomasz Mandes
Films produced by Anna Wasniewska-Gill
Films produced by Ewa Lewandowska
Films produced by Maciej Kawulski
Films produced by Robert Kijak
Films produced by Tomasz Mandes
Films set in Warsaw
Films with screenplays by Barbara Białowąs
Films with screenplays by Blanka Lipińska
Films with screenplays by Tomasz Klimala
Films with screenplays by Tomasz Mandes
Gangster films
Golden Raspberry Award winning films
2020s Italian-language films
Obscenity controversies in film
Polish erotic drama films
2020s Polish-language films
Polish romantic drama films
Films shot in Italy
Films shot in Poland
2020 multilingual films
Polish multilingual films